The 2017–18 Liga Nacional de Fútbol de Guatemala season is the 20th season in which the Apertura and Clausura season is used. The season began on 28 July 2017 and will ended in May 2018.

Format
The format for both championships are identical. Each championship will have two stages: a first stage and a playoff stage. The first stage of each championship is a double round-robin format. The teams that finish first and second in the standings will advance to the playoffs semifinals, while the teams that finish 3–6 will enter in the quarterfinals. The winner of each quarterfinal will advance to the semifinals. The winners of the semifinals will advance to the finals, which will determine the tournament champion.

Managerial changes

Beginning of the season

During the Apertura season

Between Apertura and Clausura seasons

During the Apertura season

Apertura
The 2017 Torneo Apertura began on 28 July 2017 and will end in December 2017.

Personnel and sponsoring

Table

Standings

Results

Playoffs

Quarterfinals 

 Cobán Imperial wins on away goals

First leg

Second leg

Semifinals 

 Antigua GFC wins on away goals

First leg

Second leg

Finals

First leg

Second leg

Clausura
The 2018 Torneo Clausura is expected to begin in January 2018 and end in May 2018.

Personnel and sponsoring

Table

Standings

(May 07, 2018) Publication of the date=15/04/2018 page 60

Results

Playoffs

Quarterfinals

First leg

Second leg 

Xelaju won 3-0 on aggregate.

Guastatoya won 5-1 on aggregate.

Semifinals

First leg

Second leg 

Xelajú MC won 3-2 on aggregate.

Guastatoya won 1-0 on aggregate.

Finals

First leg

Second leg

List of foreign players in the league
This is a list of foreign players in 2017-2018 season. The following players:
have played at least one apertura game for the respective club.
have not been capped for the Guatemala national football team on any level, independently from the birthplace

A new rule was introduced a few season ago, that clubs can only have five foreign players per club and can only add a new player if there is an injury or player/s is released.

Antigua GFC
  Agustin Herrera 
  Alejandro Diaz 
  José Antonio Mena 
  Adrián De Lemos Calderón 
  Allan Miranda 
  Fabián Arsenio Castillo 
  Manfred Russell  
  Devaughn Elliot  

Coban Imperial
  Maximiliano Lombardi 
  Ignacio Flores 
  Álvaro García 
  Victor Guay

CSD Comunicaciones  
  Javier Irazún 
  Manfred Russell 
  Isaac Acuna 
  Cesar Morales 
  Emiliano Lopez 
  Diego Estrada  
  Éric Scott 

Guastatoya  
  Josue Flores 
  Omar Dominguez 
  Miguel Puglia 
  Jose Coreno 
  Aaron Navarro 
  José Gabriel Ríos

Deportivo Malacateco
  Rafael Lezcano 
  Jhon Hurtado 
  Juan Camilo Aguirre 
  Anllel Porras Conejo

Deportivo Marquense
  Gerardo Putten 
  Juan Osorio Tobón 
  Danilo  Suarez 
  Jonathan Piñeiro Correa

 (player released during the Apertura season)
 (player released between the Apertura and Clausura seasons)
 (player released during the Clausura season)

CSD Municipal 
  Blas Perez 
  Gastón Puerari 
  Jaime Alas 
  Felipe Baloy

Deportivo Petapa
  Víctor Bolivar 
  Janderson Pereira 
  Juliano Rangel 
  Francois Swaby 
  Hugo Acosta 
  Rodrigo Cubilla 

Sanarate
  Juan Lovato 
  William Zapata

Siquinalá
  Quiarol Arzu 
  Cesar García 
  Verny Scott 
  Diego Sanchez Corrales 
  Pablo Mingorance

CD Suchitepéquez
  Kevin Santamaria 
  Jesus Lozano 
  Ze Paulo 
  Othoniel Jaramillo

Club Xelajú MC
  Vladimir Castellon 
  Juan Carlos Silva 
  Juan Yax 
  Brayan Adan Martinez

Aggregate table

CONCACAF Champions League playoff
After the suspension of the National Football Federation of Guatemala was lifted by FIFA in June 2018, it was decided that the representative of Guatemala in the 2019 CONCACAF Champions League would be decided by a two-legged playoff between the 2017 Apertura champions (Antigua GFC) and the 2018 Clausura champions (Guastatoya). The draw for the order of legs was held on 27 June 2018.

References

External links
 http://www.prensalibre.com/Deportes/FutbolNacional
 https://web.archive.org/web/20150813211930/http://lared.com.gt/pages/sec_noticia/113
 http://es.fifa.com/live-scores/nationalleagues/nationalleague=guatemala-liga-nacional-de-guatemala-2000000113/index.html

Liga Nacional de Fútbol de Guatemala seasons
1
Guatemala